Release from Agony is the third studio album by German thrash metal band Destruction, released on December 1, 1987 by Steamhammer/SPV in mainly Europe, and in 1988 by Profile/Rock Hotel Records in North America. This was their last studio album to feature bassist and lead vocalist Marcel "Schmier" Schirmer until he rejoined the band in 1999.

Musically and lyrically, Release from Agony is much darker than Destruction's previous albums, and the album saw the band resemble a mixture of thrash metal with technical and progressive elements.

Track listing

Personnel 
Destruction
 Marcel "Schmier" Schirmer – bass, vocals
 Mike Sifringer – guitars
 Harry Wilkens – guitars
 Oliver "Olli" Kaiser – drums

Production
 Kalle Trapp – production, recording, engineering, mixing
 Joachim Luetke – cover art

References

External links 
 

Destruction (band) albums
1987 albums
SPV/Steamhammer albums